Loaded may refer to:

In music:
 Loaded (The Velvet Underground album)
 Loaded (Brotha Lynch Hung album)
 Loaded (Busy Signal album)
 "Loaded" (Primal Scream song)
 "Loaded" (Deacon Blue song)
 "Loaded" (Ricky Martin song)
"Loaded", a song by Dinosaur Jr. from the album Hand It Over, 1997
 "Loaded", a song by Bernie Miller
 Loaded Records, a record label
 Loaded (band), an American hard rock band formed by Guns N' Roses ex-bassist Duff McKagan

Books
 Loaded: A Disarming History of the Second Amendment, a non-fiction study of the Second Amendment by Roxanne Dunbar-Ortiz
 Loaded (novel), the 1995 novel by Christos Tsiolkas

Other uses:
 Loaded (magazine), a British men's magazine
 Loaded (video game), a shooting game
 Loaded (American TV series), a music-video program
 Loaded, a 1994 film starring Catherine McCormack
 Loaded (2008 film), directed by Alan Pao
 Loaded (British TV series), a British remake of the Israeli show Mesudarim

See also
 Loaded dice made for cheating
 Loaded language, as in a "loaded question"
 Loaded baked potato, containing many ingredients
 Loader (disambiguation)
 Load (disambiguation)
 Loading (disambiguation)